This is a list of Danish television related events from 1963.

Events
24 February - Grethe & Jørgen Ingmann are selected to represent Denmark at the 1963 Eurovision Song Contest with their song "Dansevise". They are selected to be the seventh Danish Eurovision entry during Dansk Melodi Grand Prix held at the Tivolis Koncertsal in Copenhagen.
23 March - Denmark wins the 8th Eurovision Song Contest in London, United Kingdom. The winning song is "Dansevise", performed by Grethe & Jørgen Ingmann.

Debuts

Television shows

Ending this year

Births
2 August - Hans Pilgaard, journalist & TV host
28 August - Peter Mygind, actor & TV host
24 October - Søren Fauli, actor & director
19 November - Klaus Bondam, actor & politician
27 November - Thomas Bo Larsen, actor

Deaths

See also
 1963 in Denmark